El primero (The First One) is a studio album recorded by Puerto Rican singer Juan Manuel Lebrón released in 1990. The album became his first number-one album on the Billboard Tropical Albums chart. It was nominated for Tropical/Salsa Album of the Year at the Lo Nuestro Awards.

Track listing
This information adapted from Allmusic.

Chart performance

See also
List of number-one Billboard Tropical Albums from the 1990s

References

1990 albums
Juan Manuel Lebrón albums